Richmond County is one of the 141 Cadastral divisions of New South Wales. It lies south of the Richmond River and includes South Casino.

Richmond County was named in honour of Charles Gordon Lennox, Fifth Duke of Richmond (1791- 1860).

Parishes within this county
A full list of parishes found within this county; their current LGA and mapping coordinates to the approximate centre of each location is as follows:

References

Counties of New South Wales
Northern Rivers